TTPost is the Trinidad and Tobago postal corporation, responsible for the postal services in Trinidad and Tobago.

The company was formed in 1999, with a New Zealand operation taking over the previous government-run service. TTPost provides postal services including registered mail, courier services, package tracking and express mail within the country and internationally. It is also a source of stamps and other postal supplies. The head/general post office is at Piarco Road, now called BWIA Boulevard, replacing the former head office on Wrightson Road, Port of Spain.

See also 
 Caribbean Postal Union

External links 
 

Postal organizations
Postal system of Trinidad and Tobago
Government-owned companies of Trinidad and Tobago
Philately of Trinidad and Tobago